The 1987 All-Ireland Junior Hurling Championship was the 66th staging of the All-Ireland Junior Championship since its establishment by the Gaelic Athletic Association in 1912.

Kilkenny entered the championship as the defending champions.

The All-Ireland final was played on 25 July 1987 at Semple Stadium in Thurles, between Cork and Wexford, in what was their first ever meeting in the final. Cork won the match by 3-11 to 2-13 to claim their tenth championship title overall and a first title since 1983.

Results

Leinster Junior Hurling Championship

Leinster semi-finals

Leinster final

Munster Junior Hurling Championship

Munster first round

Munster-semi finals

Munster final

All-Ireland Junior Hurling Championship

All-Ireland final

References

Junior
All-Ireland Junior Hurling Championship